"Make Me Bad" is a song written and recorded by the American nu metal band Korn for their fourth studio album, Issues. Many Korn fans interpret the lyrics to be about frontman Jonathan Davis' getting tired of drinking or drug abuse and his decision to get sober a year prior to Issues coming out. It was released as the album's second single in February 2000, enjoying major success on US rock radio stations and in the United Kingdom. The Alien-inspired music video is one of the most expensive videos Korn have ever filmed featuring actors Brigitte Nielsen, Udo Kier, Tatjana Patitz, and Shannyn Sossamon. An acoustic medley of "Make Me Bad" and The Cure's "In Between Days" was performed with The Cure for the MTV Unplugged series in December 2006.

Music video
The video was directed by Martin Weisz, and features actresses Brigitte Nielsen, Tatjana Patitz, Shannyn Sossamon, and actor Udo Kier. Brigitte and Udo would play villains in the 2000 film, Doomsdayer. It received its world premiere in February 2000 on the short-lived USA Network music show Farmclub, alongside Limp Bizkit's video for their single, "Break Stuff". Both groups made a guest appearance to introduce their respective videos. "Make Me Bad" gained heavy airplay on MTV and MTV2 at the time of its release. Towards the end of the video, the song "Dead", also from Issues, is heard in the background. "Make Me Bad" spent sixty-five days on MTV's Total Request Live, becoming Korn's fourth and final "retired" video on June 8, 2000.

Sickness in Salvation mix
A retooled version of the video featuring Butch Vig's Sickness in Salvation remix aired occasionally during April and May 2000. It is featured as an easter egg on the band's home video Deuce.

MTV Unplugged rendition
The acoustic rendition of this song on the album MTV Unplugged: Korn is performed within a medley of The Cure's "In Between Days," with The Cure as special guests.

Appearances in media
The song has been used by apparel manufacturing company Puma in their advertisements during the time Korn had signed a contract with the company. It was also featured in the video game NHL Hitz 2002 when the game was paused.

Track listing

US Radio Promo
CD5" ESK 45584
 "Make Me Bad" (radio edit) – 3:53
 "Make Me Bad" (album version) – 3:55

Australian release
CD5" 669191 2
 "Make Me Bad" – 3:53
 "Dirty" (Single Mix) – 3:56
 "Make Me Bad" (Single Mix) – 4:11
 "Make Me Bad" (Sickness in Salvation Mix) – 3:29
 "Make Me Bad" (Danny Saber's Remix) – 4:20
 "Make Me Bad" (Kornography Mix) – 4:43
 "Make Me Bad" (Sybil Mix) – 5:15

Chart performance
The song peaked at number seven on the Billboard Modern Rock Tracks chart. It also reached number nine on the Mainstream Rock Tracks chart.

Charts

References

External links

Korn songs
1999 songs
2000 singles
Song recordings produced by Brendan O'Brien (record producer)
Immortal Records singles
Songs written by Reginald Arvizu
Songs written by Jonathan Davis
Songs written by James Shaffer
Songs written by David Silveria
Songs written by Brian Welch
Music videos directed by Martin Weisz